Asim Chaudhry is an English comedian, writer, director and actor best known for playing Chabuddy G in the BBC mockumentary series People Just Do Nothing, which he co-created. For this role, he won a Royal Television Society Award and was nominated for two British Academy Television Awards.

In 2015 and 2016, Chaudhry starred in the mockumentary Hoff the Record alongside David Hasselhoff. In 2018, Chaudhry appeared in series six of the panel show Taskmaster and starred in the television film Click & Collect alongside Stephen Merchant.

At college, Chaudhry met Hugo Chegwin, Steve Stamp, and Allan Mustafa, with whom he created YouTube mockumentary videos about a fictional pirate radio station. This led to the group being commissioned for People Just Do Nothing. Chaudhry also authored How To Be a Man under the name Chabuddy G, and the group produced music as Kurupt FM. Chaudhry wrote and directed the short film Love Pool, and has appeared in Happy New Year, Colin Burstead, Wonder Woman 1984 and Black Mirror: Bandersnatch.

Early life
Asim Chaudhry is from Hounslow, London. In high school, Chaudhry made a play parodying the 1972 crime film The Godfather, called The Poppadom Father. On a media studies course at college, he met Hugo Chegwin, Steve Stamp, and Allan Mustafa. The group made a series of YouTube mockumentaries, filmed by Chaudhry, based on their experiences as DJs on a pirate radio station in London. The mockumentaries were seen by Ash Atalla, producer of the mockumentary series The Office, and Atalla commissioned the group to make the BBC Three series People Just Do Nothing.

Career

People Just Do Nothing
Chaudhry co-created and starred in People Just Do Nothing, a BBC mockumentary sitcom which premiered in 2014. The series is largely improvised. Chaudhry plays Chabuddy G, a failed entrepreneur with high ambitions who manages the group Kurupt FM. The character is partially based on Chaudhry's father. The programme ended in 2018 after five series, as the group found it increasingly difficult to come up with new ideas. A film, People Just Do Nothing: Big in Japan, was released in 2021. A US remake is planned, in which Chaudhry will serve as an executive producer.

Chaudhry won a 2017 Royal Television Society Award for Best Comedy Performance. He was nominated for two British Academy Television Awards for Best Male Comedy Performance, in 2017 and 2018. The show also won awards for Best Scripted Comedy at the 2017 BAFTAs and 2017 RTS Awards.

Chaudhry, Hugo Chegwin, Steve Stamp, and Allan Mustafa also perform as the group Kurupt FM. Their single "Heart Monitor Riddem" was released in 2016 after featuring in People Just Do Nothing, and a music video shot by Chaudhry was released in 2018. Kurupt FM were signed to independent music label XL Recordings. Their single "Suttin Like That" was released in October 2017, and their mixtape The Lost Tapes was released in November 2017. Chaudhry has also released a comedy book, How to Be a Man, under the name Chabuddy G.

Film
In 2016, Chaudhry starred in the short film Donald Mohammed Trump as Donald Trump. The black comedy shows Trump inexplicably turning into an Asian man before a Republican Party rally. Though Chaudhry watched hours of Trump speaking in preparation, he was told by the director to instead play Trump as "a real person", so that the film could focus on the politics of the situation rather than Trump himself. Chaudhry also appeared in the comedy film Chubby Funny, about two struggling London actors, in which he played a corner shop owner.

In February 2018, the 17-minute short film Love Pool was released, which Chaudhry wrote and directed. In Love Pool, single man Mark meets a woman while carpooling with the service Uber. The film was Chaudhry's directorial debut, produced by DMC Film and released on the app Vero. It was inspired by a dinner party in which Chaudhry felt pressure from his friends to settle down, and by his carpooling experiences. Chaudhry plays the taxi driver, imagining the character as the "pissed off, sour, bitter cousin" of Chabuddy G—his character in People Just Do Nothing. The film won the 2018 People's Choice Award at Thunderdance, an independent film festival in London.

In 2018, Chaudhry appeared in the comedy film Eaten by Lions, which is about half-brothers Omar and Pete who search for Omar's estranged father after their parents are eaten by lions. It premiered at the Edinburgh International Film Festival in June 2018. In a three-star review, Steve Bennett of Chortle called Chaudhry a "scene-stealer".

On 24 December 2018, Chaudhry starred alongside Stephen Merchant in the BBC One television film Click & Collect, with a runtime of 53 minutes. The pair play Dev and Andrew, respectively, who travel  on a road trip on Christmas Eve to buy Andrew's daughter a Christmas present. Chaudhry took inspiration for Dev from a former neighbour who recognised him from the television and waved at Chaudhry when he was in the kitchen, which he could see from his living room window. Adam Starkey of Metro and Jasper Rees of The Telegraph gave the film four out of five stars. Rees commented that Chaudhry performed as Dev like "slipping into an old coat". Starkey praised the actors for "convincing, likeable performances" and wrote that Dev "takes the natural course from irritatingly vibrant neighbour to having a sympathetic, misunderstood circumstance for his enthusiasm".

In 2018, Chaudhry appeared in the Ben Wheatley black comedy Happy New Year, Colin Burstead, playing Sham. The film had a limited release at film festivals before airing on BBC Two on 30 December; a BBC television series spin-off is planned for 2019. Neil Maskell stars as Colin Burstead, who hires a manor for a New Year celebration with his extended family. Sham is an estranged character who wallows in sorrow. Stephen Dalton of The Hollywood Reporter criticised Chaudhry's character as one of several whose secondary subplots detract from the film.

Chaudhry appeared in the interactive film Black Mirror: Bandersnatch, which was released on Netflix on 28 December 2018. Part of the science fiction anthology series Black Mirror, Bandersnatch allows the viewer to make choices that affect the resultant story. Most storylines involve the young programmer Stefan adapting a book into an adventure game and descending into madness. Chaudhry stars as Mohan Thakur, the founder of the video game company Tuckersoft. The film received a mostly positive critical reception. Chaudhry received racist comments following the episode, but said of the online response that "99.9% of the stuff is positive and lovely". He commented that he and his friends have all played through the film multiple times.

Television
Chaudhry starred in the mockumentary Hoff the Record, which aired for twelve episodes on Dave in 2015 and 2016. The programme follows David Hasselhoff as he struggles to find work in the UK, with Chaudhry playing his driver. The show won an International Emmy Award for Best Comedy Series in 2016. In a four-star review of the first episode for The Telegraph, Michael Hogan called Chaudhry "the standout among the supporting cast".

In 2017, Chaudhry appeared on the quiz show Celebrity Mastermind, finishing third of four. In April 2018, he appeared in an episode of Rob Beckett's Playing For Time, in which Rob Beckett plays a series of video games with his guest. In May 2018, Chaudhry played Arnab in the Channel 4 sitcom High & Dry. The six-episode series is about a group of people who survive a plane crash, and was filmed in the Seychelles.

Chaudhry was a contestant on the sixth series of Dave panel show Taskmaster; the episodes premiered between May and July 2018. Taskmaster challenges its panellists to complete humorous and absurd tasks, such as "bring in the best liquid". The sixth series featured Chaudhry alongside Alice Levine, Liza Tarbuck, Russell Howard, and Tim Vine; it set record ratings for the programme, with an average viewership of 900,000. Sam Wollaston of The Guardian called Chaudhry "absolutely hopeless at everything, but hilariously and very likably so".

In 2018, Chaudhry appeared on chat shows The Jonathan Ross Show and The One Show, with the latter appearance in a Christmas special. In 2019, Chaudhry appeared on the first episode of The Lateish Show with Mo Gilligan.

In January 2021, Chaudhry was cast in the Netflix adaptation of The Sandman.

In 2022, Chaudhry was cast in Duke Johnson's upcoming film The Actor, based on the novel Memory by Donald E. Westlake.

Other
Chaudhry appears in British Airways' safety video as Director Chabuddy G. and in Riz Ahmed's album The Long Goodbye, also as Chabuddy G.

Filmography

Television

Film

Awards and nominations

Bibliography

Notes

References

External links
 
 
 
 

Living people
Year of birth missing (living people)
Place of birth missing (living people)
English male comedians
English male actors
People from Hounslow
1980s births